Ella and Oscar is a 1975 album by Ella Fitzgerald, accompanied by pianist Oscar Peterson and, for the second half of the album, double bassist Ray Brown.

Fitzgerald's two previous albums with piano accompaniment were 1950's Ella Sings Gershwin (with Ellis Larkins) and 1960's Ella Fitzgerald Sings Songs from Let No Man Write My Epitaph with Paul Smith.

Track listing
 "Mean to Me" (Fred E. Ahlert, Roy Turk) – 3:30
 "How Long Has This Been Going On?" (George Gershwin, Ira Gershwin) – 4:59
 "When Your Lover Has Gone" (Einar Aaron Swan) – 4:58
 "More Than You Know" (Edward Eliscu, Billy Rose, Vincent Youmans) – 4:37
 "There's a Lull in My Life" (Mack Gordon, Harry Revel) – 4:58
 "Midnight Sun" (Sonny Burke, Lionel Hampton, Johnny Mercer) – 3:40
 "I Hear Music" (Burton Lane, Frank Loesser) – 5:12
 "Street of Dreams" (Sam M. Lewis, Victor Young) – 4:08
 "April in Paris" (Vernon Duke, Yip Harburg) – 8:37

Personnel
 Ella Fitzgerald – vocals
 Oscar Peterson – piano
 Ray Brown – double bass

References

1975 albums
Ella Fitzgerald albums
Oscar Peterson albums
Pablo Records albums
Albums produced by Norman Granz
Collaborative albums